Jenő Huszka (a.k.a. ; 24 April 1875, Szeged – 2 February 1960, Budapest) was a Hungarian composer of operettas.

Life 
At the age of 5, he had his first performance – nicely played violin. He studied composition at the Academy of Music (Zeneakadémia) in Budapest. As a young man (in 1896) he was a member of the Lamoureux Orchestra in Paris. He also had to study law (this was the wish of his parents). After finishing his studies, he worked in the Ministry of Education in Budapest, in the department of art. His friend Ferenc Martos (1875–1938), a distinguished Hungarian librettist, worked in the same department and wrote all the librettos for his operettas.

The music of Jenő Huszka is considered fresh, sweet and romantic. It is inspired by Hungarian folk music and the waltzes of Vienna.

List of works 
(all to libretti by Ferenc Martos unless otherwise indicated)
 Tilos a bemenet (No Entry) libretto by Adolf Mérei (1899)
 Prince Bob (Bob herceg) (1902)
 Aranyvirág (Golden Flower) (1903)
 Gül Baba (1905)
 Tündérszerelem (Fairy love) 1907
 Rébusz báró (Baron Rebus) 1909
 Nemtudomka (Night-club Girl) 1914
 Baroness Lili (Lili bárónő) (1919)
 Hajtóvadászat (Riding to Hounds) 1926
 Erzsébet (Elizabeth) 1939
 Gyergyói bál (Ball at Gyergyó) 1941
 Mária fôhadnagy (Corporal Mária or Lieutenant Mary) 1942
 Szép Juhászné (Lovely Mrs Juhász) 1955
 Szabadsag, szerelem (Liberty and Love) 1955

See also 
 :Category:Hungarian-language operas

1875 births
1960 deaths
19th-century Hungarian people
20th-century Hungarian people
19th-century classical composers
20th-century classical composers
19th-century classical violinists
Male classical violinists
20th-century classical violinists
Hungarian classical composers
Hungarian male classical composers
Hungarian operetta composers
Male opera composers
Hungarian classical violinists
Franz Liszt Academy of Music alumni
People from Szeged
19th-century male musicians
Austro-Hungarian musicians